A bad date list (also known as a bad date book or Ugly Mugs) circulates details of persons that may pose a threat to sex workers.  Bad date lists can serve as a warning system, so that sex workers can avoid persons who fit descriptions on the list.

Bad date lists contain reports of 'bad dates' or incidents of violent or dangerous clients or other persons, which describe the incident, and frequently provide a description of the person, their vehicle (if applicable) and their phone number (if applicable).

Bad date lists can be handed out to outdoor sex workers.  Reports can be collected by outreach workers who are distributing the list.  Bad date list websites are also frequently used, mainly by indoor sex workers.  Sometimes information comes from the police or the media.

The first Canadian bad date book was published in Vancouver, Canada by the "Alliance for Safety of Prostitutes" (ASP) in 1983.  The Prostitution Collective in Victoria, Australia developed the first Ugly Mugs Scheme in May 1986, using the term 'ugly mugs' to describe punters who become unreasonable and violent.

Many organizations produce a "bad date list" including:
Sex Professionals of Canada 
COYOTE (in New York, NY)
WISH (in Vancouver, BC)
Crossroads (Alberta, Canada)
Downtown Eastside Youth Activities Centre (in Vancouver, BC)
The Bad Date Coalition of Toronto
Project SAFE (Philadelphia, PA)
Street Workers' Advocacy Project (Saskatchewan, Canada)
Bad Date Sheet Intervention Project (Tacoma, WA)

Websites 
National Ugly Mugs (UK) run by UK Network of Sex Work Projects (UKNSWP)
UglyMugs.ie (Ireland)

References 

Sorfleet, A. (1995, July). Starting a Bad Trick Sheet. Coalition Advocating Safer Hustling Vol. 2 No. 3

External links
 Gregoire, L. (2003). AVENGE THE DEAD, BUT REMEMBER THE LIVING. Vue Weekly. 
 Woolleyparmod.call. viral..8929480751. Straight Talk.
 Black, D. (2005, August 4). Prostitutes Identify `Bad Dates' on Website. Toronto Star.

Prostitution